The Divide: Enemies Within is a 1996 action-adventure video game for the PlayStation and Windows.

Development
Director and designer Ian Verchere was a Metroid fan. He purposely designed The Divide to be a Metroid clone, knowing there could never be an official Metroid game for the PlayStation because it was a Nintendo series.

Reception

The Divide: Enemies Within received mostly negative reviews. Scary Larry of GamePro, reviewing the PlayStation version, wrote, "If you do the math, you'll find that the Divide comes up short in all areas." He cited the blocky graphics, dull level design, and shaky controls which make the player's mech often aim incorrectly. Dan Hsu of Electronic Gaming Monthly said the story is "deep and involving", but that this does not matter in an action game. He and his three co-reviewers found the game generally average due to the low frame rate, uninspired graphics, and inaccurate aiming. A reviewer for Next Generation criticized the dark, grainy graphics, last generation gameplay, and difficulty with moving diagonally. He concluded that "The Divide: Enemies Within plays just well enough to avoid being insulting, but leaves the distinct impression it was thrown together using a recipe from some 'How to Make a Videogame' book. It's uninspired and lacking." In contrast, Victor Lucas of The Electric Playground called it "one of those consummate gamer's games. You know, the kind that will be talked about (and played) for a long, long time." While he agreed that the gameplay is last generation, he found it excellent due to the level design, massive length, and ongoing exploration of new and hidden areas. He also praised the game's cinematic intro, graphic design, and music.

2021 fanmade patch
In Dec 2021, the game received a 25-year anniversary fanmade patch.

References

External links

The Divide: Enemies Within at Hardcore Gaming 101

1996 video games
Action-adventure games
Metroidvania games
North America-exclusive video games
PlayStation (console) games
Science fiction video games
Video games developed in Canada
Video games featuring female protagonists
Video games scored by Paul Ruskay
Windows games